Dalenda Bouzgarrou-Larguèche (born 1953), better known as Dalenda Larguèche, is a Tunisian historian specializing in the early modern period and women in Islamic societies. She is also a longtime political activist, particularly focused on the rights of women and other marginalized people.

Biography 
Larguèche was born in 1953 in Monastir, Tunisia.

She joined the Tunisian Communist Party during a period when it was banned in the country, although the ban was lifted in 1981. She also became an activist with the Tunisian Association of Democratic Women and the Association of Tunisian Women for Research and Development.

Larguèche attended Tunis University, graduating in 1986 with a doctoral degree. She then became a professor of early modern history at Manouba University.

Her activism extended to her work as an academic. In the early 1990s, with the support of some of her colleagues, she launched and developed the study of women's history at Manouba University. Despite some resistance, the subject was introduced to the university's Department of Letters, Arts, and Humanities.

She has served on the scientific councils of Tunis University, Manouba University, the Laboratory of Regions and Heritage Resources of Tunisia, and the American Institute for Maghrib Studies. She also oversees the "Gender, Women, Society, and Culture" research team.

After being fired by Minister for Women's Affairs Sihem Badi and replaced with Rachida Tlili Sellaouti, she returned to the director-general role from 2016 to 2018.

She is married to the historian Abdelhamid Larguèche, with whom she has frequently collaborated on research, particularly on Tunisia's marginalized populations including prostitutes, Jews, Black Tunisians, and the poor.

Awards and recognition 
 CREDIF prize for the best work of French-language scientific research (2001)
 Book Prize from the Arab Maghreb Union (2007)
 CREDIF prize for the best scientific research on women and gender (2011)
 Officer of the Order of the Republic of Tunisia (2015)

Selected works

In French 
 Marginales en terre d’Islam (with Abdelhamid Larguèche), 1993
 Mémoire de femmes : Tunisiennes dans la vie publique, 1920-1960 (collective work), 1994
 Histoire des femmes du Maghreb : culture matérielle et vie quotidienne (editor), 2000
 Territoire sans frontières : la contrebande et ses réseaux dans la régence de Tunis au XIXe siècle, 2001
 Femmes en ville dans le monde méditerranéen : passé et présent (editor), 2005
 Monogamie en islam : l’exception kairouanaise, 2011

In Arabic 
 L’Histoire du Maghreb moderne à travers les sources (المغرب العربي الحديث من خلال المصادر) (with Abdelhamid Larguèche and Jamel Ben Taher), 2006

References 

1953 births
20th-century Tunisian historians
Academic staff of Manouba University
Tunisian women writers
Tunisian feminists
Tunisian women activists
Living people
People from Monastir Governorate
21st-century Tunisian historians